Waiting...  is a 2005 American independent black comedy film written and directed by Rob McKittrick (in his directorial debut) and starring Ryan Reynolds, Anna Faris, and Justin Long. McKittrick wrote the screenplay while working as a waiter.

The script was initially sold in a film deal to Artisan Entertainment, but was released by Lions Gate Entertainment (which purchased Artisan in 2003). Producers Chris Moore and Jeff Balis of Live Planet's Project Greenlight fame also took notice of the project and assisted. The film made over US$6 million, more than twice the budget of the film, in its opening weekend.

Plot
The film takes place during a single day at "Shenaniganz", a franchise restaurant. Dean, who has been working there for four years, learns from his mother that a schoolmate recently graduated from college and has secured a high paying job in electrical engineering. 

Dean's co-worker Monty takes new employee Mitch through his training, introducing him to the staff both in the restaurant and kitchen. Monty also shows Mitch the "Penis Game", where the male staff deliberately expose their genitalia to their unsuspecting coworkers, as well as the ways the staff deal with rude and entitled customers. In one scene food is sent back which the kitchen staff then gladly contaminate with spit, dandruff and other unsavory bits.

The remaining waitstaff are Serena, Monty's ex-girlfriend; Natasha, the underage hostess who shares a mutual attraction with Monty; Amy, who is Dean's girlfriend; Calvin, a hopeless romantic who cannot urinate in public, and Naomi, a constantly angry waitress. Managing them is Dan, who offers Dean the Assistant Manager position in competition to Calvin. An altercation with a customer who left a pitiful tip to Dean results in Dan demanding an answer from him by the end of the day.

As the day winds down, Dean is left on his own during the final hour of business. Two new guests arrive, one of which Dean quickly realizes is Chet, his successful schoolmate. Initially annoyed, Dean is humbled by Chet when he leaves Dean $100 for his $30 meal, rendering in a $70 tip. Chet reiterates 'You look like you need it more than me', which Dean had retorted to the earlier customer. Dean is called to Dan's office to give his decision in regards to the promotion, and turns it down and to instead return to college for a more promising future.

As the shift ends, the staff head to a party at Monty and Dean's house, where Monty refrains from having sex with Natasha as she is not of legal age yet, but promises they will the following week after her birthday. Mitch, who had been unable to speak all day largely due to Monty's interruptions, finally rants in regards to the entire staff and quits. Prior to leaving, Mitch exposes his genitals in the form of "The Goat", which head chef Raddimus had said earlier would grant him instant god-status. Monty declares his allegiance to Mitch, having now replaced Dean in his absence.

In a post credits scene, Dan is shown arriving at the customers house who Dean had insulted earlier, incorrectly believing it was the location of the party. The customer angrily demands from Dan the milkshake he was earlier promised.

Cast

Production
Waiting... was filmed in New Orleans; Jefferson Parish, Louisiana; and Kenner, Louisiana.

Release
The film grossed $6,021,106 opening weekend in 1,652 theaters. It opened at #7 in the U.S. box office. Its total gross was $18,637,690 with $16,124,543 within the U.S. and $2,513,147 in foreign markets.

Reception
The film received negative reviews. The film holds a 30% approval rating on Rotten Tomatoes, based on 92 reviews with an average rating of 4.18 out of 10; the site's consensus states: "Waiting... is a gross-out comedy that's more gross than comic."  Metacritic gave the film a 30/100, indicating "generally unfavorable reviews". Roger Ebert gave the film a 1.5 stars out of 4 claiming that "Waiting... is melancholy for comedy". Despite negative reviews from critics, Waiting... has garnered a small cult following.

Sequel
A direct-to-DVD sequel, titled Still Waiting..., was released on February 17, 2009. The second film is about another Shenaniganz location dealing with new competition from a Hooters-like sports bar called TaTa's Wing Shack run by Calvin from the first film.

References

External links

 
 
 
 

2005 films
2005 comedy-drama films
2005 directorial debut films
2005 independent films
2000s coming-of-age comedy-drama films
2000s English-language films
American coming-of-age comedy-drama films
American independent films
Films about food and drink
Films about pranks
Films set in restaurants
Films shot in New Orleans
Lionsgate films
Workplace comedy films
2000s American films